The Incarnate Word Cardinals, also known as UIW Cardinals, are composed of 23 teams representing the University of the Incarnate Word in intercollegiate athletics, including men and women's basketball, cross country, golf, soccer, swimming & diving, tennis, and track and field. Men's sports include baseball and football. Women's sports include softball, synchronized swimming, and volleyball. The Cardinals compete in NCAA Division I and are members of the Southland Conference. UIW has sent multiple fencers to compete in multiple NCAA Fencing Championships (2016 & 2017). On November 12, 2021, Incarnate Word accepted their invitation to join the Western Athletic Conference in 2022. However, on June 24, 2022, just one week before the change of conferences was scheduled to take place, Incarnate Word announced that it would remain in the Southland Conference.

Sports sponsored

See also
List of NCAA Division I institutions

References

External links